Ainius Sabaliauskas (born 26 July 2003) is a Lithuanian tennis player.

Sabaliauskas has a career high ATP singles ranking of 1782 achieved on 15 August 2022. He also has a career high ATP doubles ranking of 1100 achieved on 13 June 2022.

Sabaliauskas represents Lithuania at the Davis Cup, where he has a W/L record of 1–1.

References

External links

2003 births
Living people
Lithuanian male tennis players
Sportspeople from Panevėžys
21st-century Lithuanian people